Giovanni Montesdeoca (born March 28, 1998) is an American soccer player who plays as a forward.

Career

Youth
Montesdeoca joined the FC Dallas academy in 2014, where he played until 2016. Giovanni while with FC Dallas Academy scored 27 goals in his first season with FC Dallas, and help to lead the team to two USSDA National Championship.

College
In 2016, Montesdeoca attended the University of North Carolina at Chapel Hill to play college soccer. He didn't appear for North Carolina in 2016, starting his freshman season the next year. He missed the 2019 season due to an ACL injury and only took part in a shortened season due to the COVID-19 pandemic. During his time with the Tar Heels, he made 37 appearances, scoring 13 goals and tallying 6 assists.

Amateur
Whilst at college, Montesdeoca appeared in the USL PDL for Texas United in 2017 and 2018, and in the NPSL for Denton Diablos in 2019. Montesdeoca played in the 2018 U.S. Open Cup with NTX Rayados, playing alongside his uncle José Burciaga Jr.

Professional
On January 21, 2021, Montesdeoca was selected 79th overall in the 2021 MLS SuperDraft by FC Dallas. However, he did not sign with the club. On July 2, 2021, Montesdeoca signed with USL Championship side Loudoun United. He debuted for the team two days later, starting in a 2–0 loss to Hartford Athletic.

Montesdeoca joined USL League One club Union Omaha on February 10, 2022.

Personal

Montesdeoca is the nephew of former professional soccer player José Burciaga Jr., who played for Kansas City Wizards and Colorado Rapids in MLS.

References

External links 
 North Carolina Tar Heels Profile

1998 births
Living people
American soccer players
Association football forwards
FC Dallas draft picks
Loudoun United FC players
National Premier Soccer League players
North Carolina Tar Heels men's soccer players
Soccer players from Dallas
Union Omaha players
USL Championship players
USL League One players
USL League Two players